Gilberto Telechea (born 4 March 1885, date of death unknown) was a Uruguayan fencer. He competed in the individual foil event at the 1924 Summer Olympics.

References

External links
 

1885 births
Year of death missing
Uruguayan male foil fencers
Olympic fencers of Uruguay
Fencers at the 1924 Summer Olympics
20th-century Uruguayan people